The 2010–11 Biathlon World Cup was a multi-race tournament over a season of biathlon, organised by the International Biathlon Union. The season started on 29 November 2010 in Östersund, Sweden and ended 20 March 2011 in Holmenkollen, Norway.

Calendar
Below is the IBU World Cup calendar for the 2010–11 season.

World Cup podiums

Men

Women

Men's team

Women's team

Mixed Relay

Standings: Men

Overall 

Final standings after 26 races.

Individual 

Final standings after 4 races.

Sprint 

Final standings after 10 races.

Pursuit 

Final standings after 7 races.

Mass start 

Final standings after 5 races.

Relay 

Final standings after 4 races.

Nation 

Final standings after 21 races.

Standings: Women

Overall 

Final standings after 26 races.

Individual 

Final standings after 4 races.

Sprint 

Final standings after 10 races.

Pursuit 

Final standings after 7 races.

Mass start 

Final standings after 5 races.

Relay 

Final standings after 4 races.

Nation 

Final standings after 21 races.

Standings: Mixed

Mixed Relay 

Final standings after 3 races.

Medal table

Achievements
First World Cup career victory
 , 27, in her 7th season — the WC 1 Sprint in Östersund; first podium was 2007–08 Sprint in Pokljuka
 , 22, in his 2nd season — the WC 2 Sprint in Hochfilzen; it also was his first podium
 , 28, in her 8th season — the WC 4 Sprint in Oberhof; first podium was 2009–10 Sprint in Oberhof
 , 23, in his 3rd season — the WC 6 Sprint in Anholz; it also was his first podium
 , 24, in his 4th season — the WC 7 Pursuit in Presque Isle; first podium was 2009–10 Individual in Antholz
 , 29, in his 10th season — the WC 9 Sprint in Oslo; first podium was 2004–05 Sprint in Pokliuka

First World Cup podium
, 20, in her 2nd season — no. 2 in the WC 1 Sprint in Östersund
, 21, in his 2nd season — no. 2 in the WC 3 Individual in Pokljuka
, 25, in her 6th season — no. 3 in the WC 7 Sprint in Presque Isle
, 21, in his 3rd season — no. 3 in the WCh Mass Start in Khanty-Mansiysk

Victory in this World Cup (all-time number of victories in parentheses)

Men
 , 8 (24) first places
 , 5 (5) first places
 , 3 (6) first places
 , 2 (5) first places
 , 2 (4) first places
 , 1 (92) first place
 , 1 (6) first place
 , 1 (3) first place
 , 1 (1) first place
 , 1 (1) first place
 , 1 (1) first place

Women
 , 6 (12) first places
 , 5 (24) first places
 , 4 (13) first places
 , 3 (3) first places
 , 2 (20) first places
 , 2 (3) first places
 , 1 (12) first places
 , 1 (9) first places
 , 1 (3) first places
 , 1 (1) first places

Retirements
Following are notable biathletes who announced their retirement:

References

External links
IBU official site

 
Biathlon World Cup
World Cup
World Cup